Ingrid Lempereur  (born 26 June 1969 in Messancy, Province of Luxembourg, Belgium) is a former international swimmer from Belgium. She won the bronze medal in the 200 m breaststroke race at the 1984 Summer Olympics in Los Angeles at the age of 15.

References

1969 births
Living people
People from Messancy
Belgian female breaststroke swimmers
Swimmers at the 1984 Summer Olympics
Swimmers at the 1988 Summer Olympics
Olympic swimmers of Belgium
Olympic bronze medalists for Belgium
Olympic bronze medalists in swimming
European Aquatics Championships medalists in swimming
Walloon sportspeople
Sportspeople from Luxembourg (Belgium)
Medalists at the 1984 Summer Olympics
Universiade medalists in swimming
Universiade gold medalists for Belgium
Universiade silver medalists for Belgium
Medalists at the 1987 Summer Universiade